The Allison T56 turboprop engine has been developed extensively throughout its production run, the many variants are described by the manufacturer as belonging to four main series groups.

Initial civil variants (Series I) were designed and produced by the Allison Engine Company as the 501-D and powered the Lockheed C-130 Hercules. Later variants (Series II, III, 3,5 and IV) gave increased performance through design refinements.

Further derivatives of the 501-D/T56 were produced as turboshafts for helicopters including a variant with a United States military aircraft engine designation of T701, which was developed for the canceled Boeing Vertol XCH-62 project.

Commercial variants (501-D)

501-D13A (Series I) Similar to the 501-D13 but using a Hamilton Standard propeller; certified on April 15, 1958.

501-D13D (Series I) Similar to the 501-D13 except for the location of the rear mount and using D.C. generator drive; certified on December 18, 1959; used on the Convair CV-580 passenger aircraft.

501-D13E (Series I) Similar to the 501-D13 except for the location of the rear mount; certified on December 18, 1959.

501-D13H (Series I) Similar to the 501-D13D but with water-methanol injection; certified on February 20, 1964; used on the USAF's General Dynamics NC-131H Samaritan. and the Convair CV-580.

501-D15 A  engine under development for the Lockheed Electra.

501-D22 (Series II) Similar to the 501-D13A but with  power rating at sea level takeoff, a shroud turbine, gearbox offset up, and no auto-feathering; certified on October 28, 1964. Used on the Lockheed L-100 Hercules.

501-D22A (Series III); Similar to the 501-D22 but with  power rating at sea level takeoff and air-cooled first-stage turbine blades, vanes, and stalk blades in all four turbine stages; certified on January 23, 1968.

501-D22C (Series III) Similar to the 501-D22A but with gearbox offset down, integral mount pads, and water-methanol injection; certified on December 27, 1968; powered the Aero Spacelines Super Guppy.

501-D22D A  derivative to power the proposed Lockheed L-400, a twin-engine version of the L-100.

501-D22E Offered in 1979 as the initial engine for Lockheed's proposed L-100-60 (a stretched derivative of the Lockheed L-100).

501-D22G (Series III) Similar to the 501-D22C but with  power rating at sea level takeoff, a three-mount system, auto-feathering, and no water-methanol injection; certified on March 23, 1984. Used on the Convair CV-580

501-D36 (Series II) Re-engined powerplant for the Royal Canadian Air Force (RCAF) CC-109 Cosmopolitan in 1966.

501-D39 (Series IV) Offered for the Lockheed L-100 civil aircraft, starting in 1979 for the proposed L-100-60 as the successor engine to the 501-D22E, producing  with  propellers; was the commercial version of the 501-M71.

501-H2 Engine for the proposed Vanguard Model 30 lift fan aircraft that was entered in a 1961 vertical takeoff and landing (VTOL) transport competition; powered two  fans within the wings and two  propellers; used a modified compressor for handling larger air flows.

501-M22 Internal designation for the T56-A-18; submitted for FAA certification under a new type certificate.

501-M23 Submitted for FAA certification under an amended type certificate.

501-M24 A demonstrator engine started in 1964 that was later used to derive the 501-M62B engine developed for the XCH-62 helicopter.

501-M26 A  similar to the 501-M25 but with a free turbine instead of a fixed turbine, and a two-stage gas producer turbine; based on the T56-A-18 engine.

501-M34 A  turboshaft engine targeted for a 60-70 seat commuter helicopter proposal from Lockheed-California in 1966.

501-M56 Engine candidate for the turboprop version of the Air Force A-X close air support aircraft, requiring  of engine power.

501-M71 A derivative of the T56-A-14 evaluated by NAVAIR in 1982 to achieve 10% lower fuel consumption, 24% more horsepower, smokeless exhaust, and greater reliability.

501-M71K (Series IV) A  engine using a larger propeller to power the Lockheed L-100-20 (L382E-44K-20) High Technology Test Bed (HTTB) for short takeoff and landing (STOL) starting in 1989, but was destroyed when the HTTB became airborne during a ground test on February 3, 1993.

501-M78 A  demonstrator engine for NASA's Propfan Test Assessment (PTA) program. It had a modified reduction gearbox that reversed the direction of rotation and increased the output speed from 1,020 rpm to 1,698 rpm. The engine was attached to an eight-bladed, single-rotation Hamilton Standard SR-7L propeller. Shown as an  engine at the 1983 Dayton Air Show, the 501-M78 was flight-tested on a Gulfstream II aircraft beginning in May 1987. Various flight and ground testing programs were carried out on the engine testbed through June 1989.

501-M80C Also known as the T406-AD-400, a  turboshaft engine. primarily based on the T56-A-427, but with a free-turbine turboshaft added to the single-spool engine; used on the V-22 Osprey tiltrotor assault transport.

PW–Allison 501-M80E A  contra-rotating geared propfan engine derived from the 501-M80C/T406 turboshaft engine and intended for use on a 92-seat version of the proposed MPC 75 regional aircraft; developed jointly with Pratt & Whitney.

501-M80R3 A turboprop engine offered as an equal partnership between Allison and Pratt & Whitney to power Lockheed's proposed successor to the P-3 Orion, which was developed for the U.S. Navy's long-range air antisubmarine warfare (ASW) capable aircraft (LRAACA) program.

Military variants (T56)

T56-A-1A A  engine used on the Lockheed C-130A Hercules.

T56-A-2 Proposed gas generator engines for the McDonnell XHCH-1 helicopter.

T56-A-3 A  engine that was paired with an Aeroproducts propeller and test flown by the Military Air Transport Service (MATS) on a pair of Convair YC-131C twin-turboprop aircraft between January and December 1955.

T56-A-4 A  engine for the C-131D executive transport/VC-131H VIP transport; also the proposed engines for the McDonnell XHRH-1 helicopter, with propeller drive and gas generator bleed for rotor-tip pressure jets.

T56-A-5 A  turboshaft version for the Piasecki YH-16B Transporter helicopter.

T56-A-6 Gas generator engines for the NC-130B (58-0712) boundary layer control (BLC) demonstrator.

T56-A-7A (Series II) Lockheed C-130B Hercules Starting May 1959.

T56-A-7B (Series II) Used on the U.S. Air Force C/HC/NC-130B, MC-130E, and WC-130F; similar to -A-7A.

T56-A-8 (Series II) Entered production in 1959; the original engine on the Grumman E-2C, using the Aeroproducts A6441FN-248 propeller.

T56-A-9 (Series I) Used on the U.S. Air Force C/AC/DC/GC/NC/RC-130A and the C-130D.

T56-A-9D (Series I) Lockheed C-130A Hercules starting December 1956 and on all Grumman E-2A Hawkeyes from 1960.

T56-A-9E (Series I) Similar to -A-9D. 

T56-A-10W (Series II) Water injection model that entered production in 1960.

T56-A-10WA (Series II) Used on the P-3A, EP-3A, and RP-3A.

T56-A-11 Ordered for 12 Royal Australian Air Force C-130s in 1958.

T56-A-14 (Series III) Lockheed P-3/EP-3/WP-3/AP-3/CP-140 Aurora from August 1962; entered production in 1964.

T56-A-14A (Series 3.5) Fuel efficiency and reliability upgrade, Lockheed WP-3D Orion from May 2015.

T56-A-15 (Series III) Lockheed C-130H Hercules USAF from June 1974.

T56-A-15A (Series 3.5) Upgrade of the T56-A-15 on the Air Force LC-130H.

T56-A-16 (Series III) Used on the KC-130F, KC-130R, LC-130F, and LC-130R.

T56-A-16A (Series 3.5). 

T56-A-20 Proposed in 1968 to be funded within the 1969 fiscal year component improvement program (CIP).

T56-A-100 (Series IV) U.S. Air Force EMDP demonstrator

T56-A-101 (Series IV) Offered for the Lockheed C-130 Hercules.

T56-A-422 Used on U.S. Navy Northrop Grumman E-2C Hawkeye aircraft.

T56-A-423 Used on U.S. Navy Lockheed EC-130G and EC-130Q aircraft.

T56-A-425 (Series III) Replaced the T56-A-8 on the Grumman E-2C, using the  Hamilton 54460-1 propeller; Grumman C-2A Greyhound from June 1974.

T56-A-426 Used on the C-2A, E-2B, and TE-2A
T56-A-427 (Series IV) Northrop Grumman E-2 Hawkeye upgrades from 1972.

T56-A-427A (Series IV) Used on the Northrop Grumman E-2D Advanced Hawkeye (AHE), which first flew in 2007.

T701

See also

References

Bibliography

External links
 T56 page at Rolls-Royce website

T56
1950s turboprop engines